The BOR-4 (БОР-4 , , "Unpiloted Orbital Rocketplane 4") flight vehicle is a scaled (1:2) prototype of the Soviet Spiral VTHL (vertical takeoff, horizontal landing) spaceplane. An uncrewed, subscale spacecraft, its purpose was to test the heatshield tiles and reinforced carbon-carbon for the Buran space shuttle, then under development.

Several of them were built and flown between 1982 and 1984 from the Kapustin Yar launch site at speeds of up to Mach 25. After reentry, they were designed to parachute to an ocean splashdown for recovery by the Soviet Navy. The testing was nearly identical to that carried out by the US Air Force ASSET program in the 1960s, which tested the heatshield design for the X-20 Dyna-Soar. On 16 March 1983 a Royal Australian Air Force P-3 Orion reconnaissance aircraft captured the first Western images of the craft as it was recovered by a Soviet ship near the Cocos Islands.

Flights
Seven BOR were built, and four confirmed flights took place:
 n/a – 5 December 1980 – BOR4S nº401 - suborbital flight
 Cosmos-1374 – 4 June 1982 – BOR4 nº404 – orbital flight, splashed down into the Indian Ocean. Orbit: 158 x 204km. Inclination: 50.7 degrees. Weight: possibly about 1 tonne. Number of orbits: 1.
 Cosmos-1445 – 15 March 1983 – BOR4 nº403 – orbital flight, splashed down into the Indian Ocean.
 Cosmos-1517 – 27 December 1983 – BOR4 nº405 – orbital flight, splashed down into the Black Sea.
 Cosmos-1614 – 19 December 1984 – BOR4 nº406 – orbital flight. Orbit: 176 x 223 km. Inclination: 50.7 degrees. Weight: possibly 1 tonne. Recovered after splashed down in the Black Sea.

Current locations
BOR-4S nº401 – Zhukovsky, Moscow Oblast, Russia
BOR-4  – Zhukovsky, Moscow Oblast, Russia

See also
 HL-20 Personnel Launch System
 Dream Chaser

References

External links

 Detailed page on BORs 

Buran program
Crewed spacecraft
Spacecraft launched in 1982